St. Joseph Schools or St. Joseph's Private Language School is an international school system in Sharm El Sheikh, Egypt. It has two sections: St. Joseph's American School and St. Joseph's International School. As of 2015, the director is Amel El Maghraby.

The American school serves up to grade 12. The international school has kindergarten until secondary year 3.

See also

 Education in Egypt
 List of international schools
 List of schools in Egypt

References

External links
 , the school's official website

Educational institutions in the United States with year of establishment missing
American international schools in Egypt
Buildings and structures in South Sinai Governorate
Elementary and primary schools in Egypt
International high schools
Sharm El Sheikh
High schools and secondary schools in Egypt